Indigenous Aryanism, also known as the Indigenous Aryans theory (IAT) and the Out of India theory (OIT), is the conviction that the Aryans are indigenous to the Indian subcontinent, and that the Indo-European languages radiated out from a homeland in India into their present locations. It is a "religio-nationalistic" view on Indian history, and propagated as an alternative to the established migration model, which considers the Pontic–Caspian steppe to be the area of origin of the Indo-European languages.

Reflecting traditional Indian views based on the Puranic chronology, indigenists propose an older date than is generally accepted for the Vedic period, and argue that the Indus Valley civilisation was a Vedic civilization. In this view, "the Indian civilization must be viewed as an unbroken tradition that goes back to the earliest period of the Sindhu-Sarasvati (or Indus) tradition (7000 or 8000 BCE)."

Support for the IAT mostly exists among a subset of Indian scholars of Hindu religion and the history and archaeology of India, and plays a significant role in Hindutva politics. It has no relevance, let alone support, in mainstream scholarship.

Historical background

The standard view on the origins of the Indo-Aryans is the Indo-Aryan migration theory, which states that they entered north-western India at about 1500 BCE. The Puranic chronology, the timeline of events in ancient Indian history as narrated in the Mahabaratha, the Ramayana, and the Puranas, envisions a much older chronology for the Vedic culture. In this view, the Vedas were received thousands of years ago, and the start of the reign of Manu Vaivasvate, the Manu of the current kalpa (aeon) and the progenitor of humanity, may be dated as far back 7350 BCE. The Kurukshetra War, the background-scene of the Bhagavad Gita, which may relate historical events taking place ca. 1000 BCE at the heartland of Aryavarta, is dated in this chronology at ca. 3100 BCE.

Indigenists, reflecting traditional Indian views on history and religion, argue that the Aryans are indigenous to India, which challenges the standard view. In the 1980s and 1990s, the indigenous position has come to the foreground of the public debate.

Indian homeland and Aryan Invasion theory
In 19th century Indo-European studies, the language of the Rigveda was the most archaic Indo-European language known to scholars, indeed the only records of Indo-European that could reasonably claim to date to the Bronze Age. This primacy of Sanskrit inspired scholars such as Friedrich Schlegel, to assume that the locus of the proto-Indo-European homeland had been in India, with the other dialects spread to the west by historical migration.  With the 20th-century discovery of Bronze-Age attestations of Indo-European (Anatolian, Mycenaean Greek), Vedic Sanskrit lost its special status as the most archaic Indo-European language known.

In the 1850s, Max Müller introduced the notion of two Aryan races, a western and an eastern one, which migrated from the Caucasus into Europe and India respectively. Müller dichotomized the two groups, ascribing greater prominence and value to the western branch. Nevertheless, this "eastern branch of the Aryan race was more powerful than the indigenous eastern natives, who were easy to conquer." By the 1880s, his ideas had been adapted by racist ethnologists. For example, as an exponent of race science, colonial administrator Herbert Hope Risley (1851 – 1911) used the ratio of nose width to height to divide Indian people into Aryan and Dravidian races, as well as seven castes.

The idea of an Aryan "invasion" was fueled by the discovery of the Indus Valley (Harappan) Civilisation, which declined around the period of the Indo-Aryan migration, suggesting a destructive invasion. This argument was developed by the mid-20th century archaeologist Mortimer Wheeler, who interpreted the presence of many unburied corpses found in the top levels of Mohenjo-daro as the victims of conquests. He famously stated that the Vedic god "Indra stands accused" of the destruction of the Indus Civilisation. Scholarly critics have since argued that Wheeler misinterpreted his evidence and that the skeletons were better explained as hasty interments, not unburied victims of a massacre.

Indo-Aryan migration theory

Migrations

The idea of an "invasion" has been discarded in mainstream scholarship since the 1980s, and replaced by more sophisticated models, referred to as the Indo-Aryan migration theory. It posits the introduction of Indo-Aryan languages into South Asia through migrations of Indo-European-speaking people from their Urheimat (original homeland) in the Pontic Steppes via the Central European Corded ware culture, and Eastern European/Central Asian Sintashta culture, through Central Asia into the Levant (Mitanni), south Asia, and Inner Asia (Wusun and Yuezhi). It is part of the Kurgan-hypothesis/Revised Steppe Theory, which further describes the spread of Indo-European languages into western Europe via migrations of Indo-European speaking people.

Historical linguistics provides the main basis for the theory, analysing the development and changes of languages, and establishing relations between the various Indo-European languages, including the time frame of their development. It also provides information about shared words, and the corresponding area of the origin of Indo-European, and the specific vocabulary which is to be ascribed to specific regions. The linguistic analyses and data are supplemented with archaeological and genetical data and anthropological arguments, which together provide a coherent model that is widely accepted.

In the model, the first archaeological remains of the Indo-Europeans is the Yamnaya culture, from which emerged the Central European Corded Ware culture, which spread eastward creating the Proto-Indo-Iranian Sintashta culture (2100–1800 BCE), from which developed the Andronovo culture (1800–1400 BCE). Around 1800 BCE Indo-Aryan people split-off from the Iranian branches, and migrated to the BMAC (2300–1700 BCE), and further to the Levant, northern India, and possibly Inner Asia.

Cultural continuity and adaptation
The migration into northern India was not necessarily of a large population, but may have consisted of small groups, who introduced their language and social system into the new territory when looking for pasture for their herds. These were then emulated by larger groups, who adopted the new language and culture. Witzel also notes that "small-scale semi-annual
transhumance movements between the Indus plains and the Afghan and Baluchi highlands continue to this day."

Indigenous Aryanism

According to Bryant, Indigenists

The "Indigenist position" started to take shape after the discovery of the Harappan civilisation, which predates the Vedas. According to this alternative view, the Aryans are indigenous to India, the Indus Civilisation is the Vedic Civilisation, the Vedas are older than the second millennium BCE, there is no discontinuity between the (northern) Indo-European part of India and the (southern) Dravidian part, and the Indo-European languages radiated out from a homeland in India into their present locations. According to Bresnan, it is a natural response to the 19th century narrative of a superior Aryan race subjecting the native Indians, implicitly confirming the ethnocentric superiority of the European invaders of colonial times, instead supporting "a theory of indigenous development that led to the creation of the Vedas."

Main arguments of the Indigenists
The idea of "Indigenous Aryans" is supported with specific interpretations of archaeological, genetic, and linguistic data, and on literal interpretations of the Rigveda. Standard arguments, both in support of the "Indigenous Aryans" theory and in opposition the mainstream Indo-Aryan Migration theory, are:
 Questioning the Indo-Aryan Migration theory:
 Presenting the Indo-Aryan Migration theory as an "Indo-Aryan Invasion theory", which was invented by 19th century colonialists to suppress the Indian people.
 Questioning the methodology of linguistics;
 Arguing for an indigenous cultural continuity, arguing there is a lack of archaeological remains of the Indo-Aryans in north-west India; 
 Questioning the genetic evidence
 Contesting the possibility that small groups can change culture and languages in a major way;
 Re-dating India's history by postulating a Vedic-Puranic chronology:
 Arguing for ancient, indigenous origins of Sanskrit, dating the Rigveda and the Vedic people to the 3rd millennium BCE or earlier; This includes:
 Identifying the Sarasvati River, described in the Rig Veda as a mighty river, with the Ghaggar-Hakra River, which had dried up c. 2000 BCE, arguing therefore for an earlier dating of the Rig Veda;
 Arguing for the presence of horses and horse-drawn chariots before 2000 BCE;
 Identifying the Vedic people with the Harappan civilisation;
 Redating Indian history based on the Vedic-Puranic chronology.

Questioning the Aryan Migration model

Rhetorics of "Aryan invasion"
The outdated notion of an "Aryan invasion" has been used as a straw man to attack the Indo-Aryan Migration theory. According to Witzel, the invasion model was criticised by Indigenous Aryanists for being a justification for colonial rule:

While according to Koenraad Elst, a supporter of Indigenous Aryans:

Linguistic methodology
Indigenists question the methodology and results of linguistics. According to Bryant, OIT proponents tend to be linguistic dilettantes who either ignore the linguistic evidence completely, dismiss it as highly speculative and inconclusive, or attempt to tackle it with hopelessly inadequate qualifications; this attitude and neglect significantly minimises the value of most OIT publications.

Archaeological finds and cultural continuity

In the 1960s, archaeological explanations for cultural change shifted from migration-models to internal causes of change. Given the lack of archaeological remains of the Indo-Aryans, Jim G. Shaffer, writing in the 1980s and 1990s, has argued for an indigenous cultural continuity between Harappan and post-Harappan times. According to Shaffer, there is no archaeological indication of an Aryan migration into northwestern India during or after the decline of the Harappan city culture. Instead, Shaffer has argued for "a series of cultural changes reflecting indigenous cultural developments." According to Shaffer, linguistic change has mistakenly been attributed to migrations of people. Likewise, Erdosy also notes the absence of evidence for migrations, and states that "Indo-European languages may well have spread to South Asia through migration," but that the Rigvedic aryas, as a specific ethno-linguistic tribe holding a specific set of ideas, may well have been indigenous people whose "set of ideas" soon spread over India.

Since the 1990s, attention has shifted back to migrations as an explanatory model. Pastoral societies are difficult to identify in the archaeological record, since they move around in small groups and leave little traces.  In 1990, David Anthony published a defense of migratory models, and in his The Horse, the Wheel, and Language (2007), has provided an extensive overview of the archaeological trail of the Indo-European people across the Eurasian steppes and central Asia. The development and "revolutionary" improvement of genetic research since the early 2010s has reinforced this shift in focus, as it has unearthed previously unaccessible data, showing large-scale migrations in prehistoric times.

Genetic evidence

OIT-proponents have questioned the findings of genetic research, and some older DNA-research had questioned the Indo-Aryan migrations. Since 2015 however, genetic research has "revolutionarily" improved, and further confirmed the migration of Steppe pastoralists into Western Europe and South Asia, and "many scientists who were either sceptical or neutral about significant Bronze Age migrations into India have changed their opinions."

Cultural change
Indigenists contest the possibility that small groups can change culture and languages in a major way. Mainstream scholarship explains this by elite dominance and language shift. Small groups can change a larger cultural area, when an elite male group integrates in small indigenous groups which takes over the elite language, in this case leading to a language shift in northern India. Indo-Aryan languages were further disseminated with the spread of the Vedic-Brahmanical culture in the process of Sanskritisation. In this process, local traditions ("little traditions") became integrated into the "great tradition" of Brahmanical religion, disseminating Sanskrit texts and Brahmanical ideas throughout India, and abroad. This facilitated the development of the Hindu synthesis, in which the Brahmanical tradition absorbed "local popular traditions of ritual and ideology."

Redating Indian history

Redating the Rig Veda and the Rig Vedic people

Sanskrit
According to the mainstream view, Sanskrit arose in South Asia after Indo-Aryan languages had been introduced by the Indo-Aryans in the first half of the second millennium BCE. The most archaic form of Sanskrit is Vedic Sanskrit found in the Rig Veda, composed between 1500 BCE and 1200 BCE.

Taking recourse to "Hindu astronomical lore" Indigenists argue for ancient, indigenous origins of Sanskrit, dating the Rigveda and the Vedic people to the 3rd millennium BCE or earlier. According to Subhash Kak, situating the arrival of the Aryans in the seventh millnnium BCE, the hymns of the Rig Veda are organised in accordance with an astronomical code, supposedly showing "a tradition of sophisticated observational astronomy going back to events of 3000 or 4000 BCE." His ideas have been rejected by mainstream scholars.

Horses and chariots

Several archaeological finds are interpreted as evidencing the presence of typical Indo-Aryan artefacts before 2000 BCE. Examples include the interpretation of animal bones from before 2000 BCE as horse-bones, and interpreting the Sinauli cart burials as chariots. While horse remains and related artifacts have been found in Late Harappan (1900-1300 BCE) sites, indicating that horses may have been present at Late Harappan times, horses did not play an essential role in the Harappan civilisation, in contrast to the Vedic period (1500-500 BCE). The earliest undisputed finds of horse remains in South Asia are from the Gandhara grave culture, also known as the Swat culture (c. 1400-800 BCE), related to the Indo-Aryans

Horse remains from the Harappan site Surkotada (dated to 2400-1700 BC) have been identified by A.K. Sharma as Equus ferus caballus. However, archaeologists like Meadow (1997) disagree, on the grounds that the remains of the Equus ferus caballus horse are difficult to distinguish from other equid species such as Equus asinus (donkeys) or Equus hemionus (onagers).

Bronze Age solid-disk wheel carts were found at Sinauli in 2018. They were related to the Ochre Coloured Pottery culture, and dated at ca. 2000-1800 BCE. They were interpreted by some as horse-pulled "chariots", predating the arrival of the horse-centered Indo-Aryans. According to Parpola, the carts were ox-pulled charts, and related to a first wave of Ino-Iraninan migrations into the Indian subcontinent, noting that the Ochre Coloured Pottery culture (2000-1500 BCE) shows similarities with both the Late Harappan culture and steppe-cultures.

Sarasvati river
In the Rig Veda, the goddess Sarasvati is described as a mighty river. Indigenists take these descriptions as references to a real river, the Sarasvati river, identified with the Ghaggar-Hakra, an eastern tributary to the Indus. Given the fact that the Ghaggar-Hakkra had dried-up at 2000 BCE, Indigenists argue that the Vedic people must therefore have been present much earlier.

Rig Vedic references to a physical river indicate that the Sarswati "had already lost its main source of water supply and must have ended in a terminal lake (samudra)," "depicting the present-day situation, with the Sarasvatī having lost most of its water." "Sarasvati" may also be identified with the Helmand or Haraxvati river in southern Afghanistan, the name of which may have been reused in its Sanskrit form as the name of the Ghaggar-Hakra river, after the Vedic tribes moved to the Punjab. Sarasvati of the Rig Veda may also refer to two distinct rivers, with the family books referring to the Helmand River, and the more recent 10th mandala referring to the Ghaggar-Hakra.

Identifying the Vedic people with the Harappan civilisation
Indigenists claim a continuous cultural evolution of India, denying a discontinuity between the Harappan and Vedic periods, identifying the IVC with the Vedic people. According to Kak, "the Indian civilization must be viewed as an unbroken tradition that goes back to the earliest period of the Sindhu-Sarasvati (or Indus) tradition (7000 or 8000 BCE). This identification is incompatible with the archaeological, linguistic and genetic data, and rejected by mainstream scholarship.

Postulating a Puranic chronology

The idea of "Indigenous Aryanism" fits into traditional Hindu ideas of religious history, namely that Hinduism has timeless origins, with the Vedic Aryans inhabiting India since ancient times. The ideas Indigenist ideas are rooted in the chronology of the Puranas, the Mahabharata and the Ramayana, which contain lists of kings and genealogies used to construct the traditional chronology of ancient India. "Indigenists" follow a "Puranic agenda", emphasizing that these lists go back to the fourth millennium BCE. Megasthenes, the Greek ambassador to the Maurya court at Patna at  300 BCE, reported to have heard of a traditional list of 153 kings that covered 6042 years, beyond the traditional beginning of the Kali Yuga in 3102 BCE. The royal lists are based on Sūta bardic traditions, and are derived from lists which were orally transmitted and constantly reshaped.

These lists are supplemented with astronomical interpretations, which are also used to reach an earlier dating for the Rigveda. Along with this comes a redating of historical personages and events, in which the Buddha is dated to 1100 BCE or even 1700 BCE, and Chandragupta Maurya (c. 300 BCE) is replaced by Chandragupta, the Gupta king. The Bharata War is dated at 3139–38 BCE, the start of the kali Yuga.

Indigenous Aryans scenarios

Michael Witzel identifies three major types of "Indigenous Aryans" scenarios:

1. A "mild" version that insists on the indigeneity of the Rigvedic Aryans to the North-Western region of the Indian subcontinent in the tradition of Aurobindo and Dayananda;

2. The "out of India" school that posits India as the Proto-Indo-European homeland, originally proposed in the 18th century, revived by the Hindutva sympathiser Koenraad Elst (1999), and further popularised within Hindu nationalism by Shrikant Talageri (2000);

3. The position that all the world's languages and civilisations derive from India, represented e.g. by David Frawley.

Kazanas adds a fourth scenario:

4.The Aryans entered the Indus Valley before 4500 BCE and got integrated with the Harappans, or might have been the Harappans.

Aurobindo's Aryan world-view
For Aurobindo, an "Aryan" was not a member of a particular race, but a person who "accepted a particular type of self-culture, of inward and outward practice, of ideality, of aspiration." Aurobindo wanted to revive India's strength by reviving Aryan traditions of strength and character. He denied the historicity of a racial division in India between "Aryan invaders" and a native dark-skinned population. Nevertheless, he did accept two kinds of culture in ancient India, namely the Aryan culture of northern and central India and Afghanistan, and the un-Aryan culture of the east, south and west. Thus, he accepted the cultural aspects of the division suggested by European historians.

Out of India model

The "Out of India theory" (OIT), also known as the "Indian Urheimat theory," is the proposition that the Indo-European language family originated in Northern India and spread to the remainder of the Indo-European region through a series of migrations. It implies that the people of the Harappan civilisation were linguistically Indo-Aryans.

Theoretical overview
Koenraad Elst, in his Update in the Aryan Invasion Debate, investigates "the developing arguments concerning the Aryan Invasion Theory". Elst notes:

Edwin Bryant also notes that Elst's model is a "theoretical exercise:"

And in Indo-Aryan Controversy Bryant notes:

"The emerging alternative"
Koenraad Elst summarises "the emerging alternative to the Aryan Invasion Theory" as follows.

During the 6th millennium BCE Proto-Indo-Europeans lived in the Punjab region of northern India. As the result of demographic expansion, they spread into Bactria as the Kambojas. The Paradas moved further and inhabited the Caspian coast and much of central Asia while the Cinas moved northwards and inhabited the Tarim Basin in northwestern China, forming the Tocharian group of I-E speakers. These groups were Proto-Anatolian and inhabited that region by 2000 BCE. These people took the oldest form of the Proto-Indo-European (PIE) language with them and, while interacting with people of the Anatolian and Balkan region, transformed it into a separate dialect. While inhabiting central Asia they discovered the uses of the horse, which they later sent back to the Urheimat. Later on during their history, they went on to occupy western Europe and thus spread the Indo-European languages to that region.

During the 4th millennium BCE, civilisation in India started evolving into what became the urban Indus Valley civilization. During this time, the PIE languages evolved to Proto-Indo-Iranian. Some time during this period, the Indo-Iranians began to separate as the result of internal rivalry and conflict, with the Iranians expanding westwards towards Mesopotamia and Persia, these possibly were the Pahlavas. They also expanded into parts of central Asia. By the end of this migration, India was left with the Proto-Indo-Aryans. At the end of the Mature Harappan period, the Sarasvati river began drying up and the remainder of the Indo-Aryans split into separate groups. Some travelled westwards and established themselves as rulers of the Hurrian Mitanni kingdom by around 1500 BCE (see Indo-Aryan superstrate in Mitanni). Others travelled eastwards and inhabited the Gangetic basin while others travelled southwards and interacted with the Dravidian people.

David Frawley
In books such as The Myth of the Aryan Invasion of India and In Search of the Cradle of Civilization (1995), Frawley criticises the 19th century racial interpretations of Indian prehistory, such as the theory of conflict between invading Caucasoid Aryans and Dravidians.  In the latter book, Frawley, Georg Feuerstein, and Subhash Kak reject the Aryan Invasion theory and support Out of India.

Bryant commented that Frawley's historical work is  more successful as a popular work, where its impact "is by no means insignificant", rather than as an academic study,
and that Frawley "is committed to channelling a symbolic spiritual paradigm through a critical empirico rational one".

Pseudo-historian Graham Hancock (2002) quotes Frawley's historical work extensively for the proposal of highly evolved ancient civilisations prior to the end of the last glacial period. including in India. Kreisburg refers to Frawley's "The Vedic Literature and Its Many Secrets".

Significance for colonial rule and Hindu politics

The Aryan Invasion theory plays an important role in Hindu nationalism, which favors Indigenous Aryanism. It has to be understood against the background of colonialism and the subsequent task of nation-building in India.

Colonial India

Curiosity and the colonial requirements of knowledge about their subject people led the officials of the East India Company to explore the history and culture of India in the late 18th century. When similarities between Sanskrit, Greek and Latin were discovered by William Jones, a suggestion of "monogenesis" (single origin) was formulated for these languages as well as their speakers. In the latter part of the 19th century, it was thought that language, culture and race were inter-related, and the notion of biological race came to the forefront The presumed "Aryan race" which originated the Indo-European languages was prominent among such races, and was deduced to be further subdivided into "European Aryans" and "Asian Aryans," each with their own homelands.

Max Mueller, who translated the Rigveda during 1849–1874, postulated an original homeland for all Aryans in central Asia, from which a northern branch migrated to Europe and a southern branch to India and Iran. The Aryans were presumed to be fair-complexioned Indo-European speakers who conquered the dark-skinned dasas of India. The upper castes, particularly the Brahmins, were thought to be of Aryan descent whereas the lower castes and Dalits ("untouchables") were thought to be the descendants of dasas.

The Aryan theory served politically to suggest a common ancestry and dignity between the Indians and the British. Keshab Chunder Sen spoke of British rule in India as a "reunion of parted cousins." Indian nationalist Bal Gangadhar Tilak endorsed the antiquity of Rigveda, dating it to 4500 BCE. He placed the homeland of the Aryans somewhere close to the North Pole. From there, Aryans were believed to have migrated south in the post-glacial age, branching into a European branch that relapsed into barbarism and an Indian branch that retained the original, superior civilisation.

However, Christian missionaries such as John Muir and John Wilson drew attention to the plight of lower castes, who they said were oppressed by the upper castes since the Aryan invasions. Jyotiba Phule argued that the dasas and sudras were indigenous people and the rightful inheritors of the land, whereas Brahmins were Aryan and alien.

Hindu revivalism and nationalism
In contrast to the mainstream views, the Hindu revivalist movements denied an external origin to Aryans. Dayananda Saraswati, the founder of the Arya Samaj (Society of Aryans), held that Vedas were the source of all knowledge and were revealed to the Aryans. The first man (an Aryan) was created in Tibet and, after living there for some time, the Aryans came down and inhabited India, which was previously empty.

The Theosophical Society held that the Aryans were indigenous to India, but that they were also the progenitors of the European civilisation. The Society saw a dichotomy between the spiritualism of India and the materialism of Europe.

According to Romila Thapar, the Hindu nationalists, led by Savarkar and Golwalkar, eager to construct a Hindu identity for the nation, held that the original Hindus were the Aryans and that they were indigenous to India. There was no Aryan invasion and no conflict among the people of India. The Aryans spoke Sanskrit and spread the Aryan civilization from India to the west.

Witzel traces the "indigenous Aryan" idea to the writings of Savarkar and Golwalkar. Golwalkar (1939) denied any immigration of "Aryans" to the subcontinent, stressing that all Hindus have always been "children of the soil", a notion which according to Witzel is reminiscent of the blood and soil of contemporary fascism. Since these ideas emerged on the brink of the internationalist and socially oriented Nehru-Gandhi government, they lay dormant for several decades, and only rose to prominence in the 1980s.

Bergunder likewise identifies Golwalkar as the originator of the "Indigenous Aryans" notion, and Goel's Voice of India as the instrument of its rise to notability:

Present-day political significance
Lars Martin Fosse notes the political significance of "Indigenous Aryanism". He notes that "Indigenous Aryanism" has been adopted by Hindu nationalists as a part of their ideology, which makes it a political matter in addition to a scholarly problem. The proponents of Indigenous Aryanism necessarily engage in "moral disqualification" of Western Indology, which is a recurrent theme in much of the indigenist literature.  The same rhetoric is being used in indigenist literature and the Hindu nationalist publications like the Organiser.

According to Abhijith Ravinutala, the indigenist position is essential for Hindutva exclusive claims on India:

Repercussions of the disagreements about Aryan origins have reached Californian courts with the Californian Hindu textbook case, where according to the Times of India historian and president of the Indian History Congress, Dwijendra Narayan Jha in a "crucial affidavit" to the Superior Court of California:

According to Thapar, Modi's government and the BJP have "peddled myths and stereotypes," such as the insistence on "a single uniform culture of the Aryans, ancestral to the Hindu, as having prevailed in the subcontinent, subsuming all others," despite the scholarly evidence for migrations into India, which is "anathema to the Hindutva construction of early history."

Rejection by mainstream scholarship
The Indigenous Aryans theory has no relevance, let alone support, in mainstream scholarship. According to Michael Witzel, the "indigenous Aryans" position is not scholarship in the usual sense, but an "apologetic, ultimately religious undertaking":

In her review of Bryant's The Indo-Aryan Controversy, which includes chapters by Elst and other "indigenists", Stephanie Jamison comments:

Sudeshna Guha, in her review of The Indo-Aryan Controversy, notes that the book has serious methodological shortcomings, by not asking the question what exactly constitutes historical evidence. This makes the "fair and adequate representation of the differences of opinion" problematic, since it neglects "the extent to which unscholarly opportunism has motivated the rebirth of this genre of 'scholarship. Guha:

According to Bryant, OIT proponents tend to be linguistic dilettantes who either ignore the linguistic evidence completely, dismiss it as highly speculative and inconclusive, or attempt to tackle it with hopelessly inadequate qualifications; this attitude and neglect significantly minimises the value of most OIT publications.

Fosse notes crucial theoretical and methodological shortcomings in the indigenist literature. Analysing the works of Sethna, Bhagwan Singh, Navaratna and Talageri, he notes that they mostly quote English literature, which is not fully explored, and omitting German and French Indology. It makes their works in various degrees underinformed, resulting in a critique that is "largely neglected by Western scholars because it is regarded as incompetent".

According to Erdosy, the indigenist position is part of a "lunatic fringe" against the mainstream migrationist model.

See also

 Dravidian culture
Indo-Aryans
 Indo-Iranians
 Indo-Aryan migrations
Politics
 Historiography and nationalism
 Saffronisation
 NCERT controversy
Indigenists
 Voice of Dharma
 N. S. Rajaram
 David Frawley
 Subhash Kak
Books
 The Arctic Home in the Vedas (1903)
 In Search of the Cradle of Civilization
 Aryan Invasion of India: The Myth and the Truth (1993)
 Update on the Aryan Invasion Debate (1999)
 The Rigveda: A Historical Analysis (2000)
Other
Yamnaya culture

Notes

References

Sources

Printed sources

 
 
 
 

 
 
 
 
 
 
 
 
 
 
 

 
 

 

 
 
 
 
 

 
 
 
 
 

 
 
 

 
 
 
 
 

 
 
 

 
 
 
 
 
 
 
 
 
 
 
 
 
 
 
 

 
 
 
 

 .
 
 
 
 
 
 
 

 

 
 
 
 
 

 
 
 
 
 

 
 
 
 
 
 
 
 
 

 
 
 
 
 
 
 
 

 

 
 

 
 
 
 
 .
 .
 
 .
 
 
 
 
 
 
 
 

Web-sources

Further reading

Overview
Edwin Bryant, a cultural historian, has given an overview of the various "Indigenist" positions in his PhD-thesis and two subsequent publications:
 
 
 

The Indigenous Aryan Debate and The Quest for the Origins of Vedic Culture are reports of his fieldwork, primarily interviews with Indian researchers, on the reception of the Indo-Aryan migration theory in India. The Indo-Aryan Controversy is a bundle of papers by various "indigenists", including Koenraad Elst, but also a paper by Michael Witzel.

Another overview has been given by Thomas Trautmann:
 
 

Literature by "indigenous Aryans" proponents
 
 
 Georg Feuerstein, Subhash Kak, David Frawley, In Search of the Cradle of Civilization: New Light on Ancient India Quest Books (IL) (October, 1995) 
 Lal, B. B. (2002), The Sarasvati flows on: The continuity of Indian culture, Aryan Books International, .
 Lal, B. B. (2015), The Rigvedic People: Invaders? Immigrants? or Indigenous?. See also Koenraad Elst, "Book Review: The Rig Vedic People Were Indigenous to India, Not Invaders"
 
 N. S. Rajaram, The Politics of History: Aryan Invasion Theory and the Subversion of Scholarship (New Delhi: Voice of India, 1995) .
 Talageri, S. G., The Rigveda: A Historical Analysis,  New Delhi: Aditya Prakashan, 2000   
 
 

Bharat
 

Criticism
 Shereen Ratnagar (2008), The Aryan homeland debate in India, in Philip L. Kohl, Mara Kozelsky, Nachman Ben-Yehuda "Selective remembrances: archaeology in the construction, commemoration, and consecration of national pasts", pp 349–378
 Suraj Bhan (2002), "Aryanization of the Indus Civilization" in Panikkar, KN, Byres, TJ and Patnaik, U (Eds), The Making of History, pp 41–55.
 

Other

External links

 Thapar, Romila: The Aryan question revisited (1999)
 Witzel, Michael: The Home of the Aryans
 Witzel, Horseplay at Harappa, Harvard University
 A tale of two horses – Frontline, 11–24 November 2000.
 Linda Hess, The Indigenous Aryan Discussion on RISA-L: The Complete Text (to 10/28/96)
 Thomas Trautmann (2005), The Aryan Debate: Introduction

Politics of India
Indology
Vedic period
History of India
Sanskrit
Evolution of language
Aryans
Indigenous Aryanism
Indo-Aryan peoples